Holweck is a German surname and may refer to:

 Fernand Holweck (1890–1941), French physicist
 Fernand Holweck Medal and Prize, in physics
 Holweck pump, for producing low pressures
 Frederick George Holweck (1856–1927), German-American Roman Catholic priest and scholar, hagiographer and church historian*  (1924–2007), German artist and art educator; see Ellen Marx (artist)

German-language surnames